Albert Batyrov (born November 2, 1981 in Vladikavkaz) is a male freestyle wrestler from Belarus. He participated in Men's freestyle 66 kg at 2008 Summer Olympics. In the 1/8 of final he beat North Korean Yang Chun-Song then in 1/4 of final he lost with Ukrainian Andriy Stadnik. In repechage round he lost with Sushil Kumar from India and was eliminated.

External links
 Wrestler bio on beijing2008.com
 

Living people
1981 births
Olympic wrestlers of Belarus
Wrestlers at the 2008 Summer Olympics
Belarusian male sport wrestlers
Sportspeople from Vladikavkaz
21st-century Belarusian people
20th-century Belarusian people